Miloslav Mečíř and Tomáš Šmíd were the defending champions, but Šmíd did not compete this year.

Mečíř teamed up with Wojciech Fibak and successfully defended his title, by defeating Tom Nijssen and Johan Vekemans 7–6, 5–7, 6–2 in the final.

Seeds

Draw

Draw

References

External links
 Official results archive (ATP)
 Official results archive (ITF)

Doubles